Shatura is a town and the administrative center of Shatursky District in Moscow Oblast, Russia, located on Lake Svyatoye  east of Moscow. Population:

History

A settlement on the site of modern Shatura has existed since 1423. In 1917, peat deposits mining started in the vicinity. In 1918, construction of the first peat-fueled electric Shatura Power Station began near the village of Torbeyevka. In 1919, the settlement of Shaturstroy was founded nearby and in 1920, the settlement of Chyornoye Ozero followed. In 1928, the three settlements were merged to form the settlement of Shatura, which was granted town status in 1936.

Administrative and municipal status
Within the framework of administrative divisions, Shatura serves as the administrative center of Shatursky District. As an administrative division, it is, together with twenty-three rural localities, incorporated within Shatursky District as the Town of Shatura. As a municipal division, the Town of Shatura is incorporated within Shatursky Municipal District as Shatura Urban Settlement.

Sports
Shatura is home to bandy club Energiya and Celtic inspired football club Celtic Shatura

References

Notes

Sources

External links
 Official website of Shatura
 Website of local history of Shatura

Cities and towns in Moscow Oblast
Shatursky District